Robert Edward Petre, 10th Baron Petre (3 September 1763 – 29 March 1809) was a British peer, the son of Robert Edward Petre, 9th Baron Petre (1742–1801) and his first wife, Anne Howard (1742–1787).

On 14 February 1786, in London, Lord Petre married Mary Bridget Howard (29 September 1767 – 30 May 1843), sister of the 12th Duke of Norfolk. They were the parents of seven children;

Maria Juliana Petre (c. 1787-27 January 1824)
Juliana Anne Petre (c. 1791-5 June 1862)
William Henry Francis Petre, 11th Baron Petre (22 January 1793 – 3 July 1850)
Charles Berney Petre (17 December 1794 – 18 June 1854)
Elizabeth Anne Mary Petre (c. 1797-4 March 1848)
Anna Maria Petre (c. 1800 - 14 October 1864)
Arabella Petre (c. 1802-24 June 1886); became a nun

By the beginning of the 19th century, the Rector was paying the pensioners of the almshouses 6s 8d each month (about £13 today), £1 annually for the purchase of firewood, and 12s each year for the stipulated livery of the Charity. At Christmas, the 20 deserving souls each received 6s 8d, and the 40 at Easter, 13s 4d.

He was the first person to develop the idea of a combined ornamented farm and garden. The property lies on the two sides of a hill, and on a flat at the foot of it. The brow of the hill commands two prospects; the one over a fertile plain watered by the Thames and broken by St. Ann's Hill and Windsor Castle, a large mead below spreading to the banks of the river. The other view is more wooded, and from this, the bold arch of Walton Bridge is a conspicuous object equally singular and noble. When Mr. Southcote died in 1758, without issue, he gave this place to his lady. By her will, dated 25 April 1771, she devised her seat, consisting of a 'capital messuage', large garden, and an ornamented farm used therewith, then in her own occupation, to Thomas Berney Bramston and John Maire Esq., on trust to settle the same on her esteemed friend and kinsman Robert Edward lord Petre for life, and thence to heirs male. She died in 1783 and the trustees made the settlement as directed.

References

1763 births
1809 deaths
Robert
British Roman Catholics
10